Eutrichillus neomexicanus is a species of longhorn beetles of the subfamily Lamiinae. It was described by Champlain and Knull in 1925.

References

Beetles described in 1925
Acanthocinini